Qoshalaq (Qoşalaq) is a village in Kurmangazy District, Atyrau Region, Kazakhstan.

Notable people
Baktykozha Izmukhambetov, Kazakh politician, chairman of the Mazhilis from March to June 2016.

References

Populated places in Turkistan Region